The 2007 Pavel Roman Memorial was the 13th edition of an annual international ice dancing competition held in Olomouc, Czech Republic. The event was held between November 16 and 18, 2007. Ice dancers competed in the senior, junior, and novice levels.

Results

Senior

External links
 results

Pavel Roman Memorial, 2007
Pavel Roman Memorial